The 49° Targa Florio took place on 9 May 1965, on the Circuito Piccolo delle Madonie, Sicily (Italy).

Race

The Scuderia Ferrari team returned after a year of voluntary absence, deploying 3 of the new prototype-class, 3.3L 275 P2. Porsche responded with the 904 in its various iterations including the experimental 904 Bergspyder, an open, lightweight, hillclimbing prototype based on the 8-cylinder 904/8. Ford replaced the under-performing Cobras of the previous year with a single GT40 roadster.
The race was ultimately dominated by the Ferrari 275 P2 driven by Vaccarella and Bandini, while the Bergspyder achieved the second place. The heavy and overpowered Ford GT40 struggled in the tortuous track but managed to complete most of the race, crashing during the 9th lap.

Official results

References

Targa Florio
Targa Florio